Cornell Krieger is a German-born former American soccer player.

National team
Krieger earned four caps with the U.S. national team in March 1965. All three games were World Cup qualifiers. The U.S. did not qualify for the World Cup that year.

References

Living people
Year of birth missing (living people)
German emigrants to the United States
United States men's international soccer players
American soccer players
Association footballers not categorized by position